Elections were held in Wellington County, Ontario on October 25, 2010 in conjunction with municipal elections across the province.

Wellington County Council

Centre Wellington

Erin

Guelph/Eramosa

Mapleton

Minto

Puslinch

Wellington North

2010 Ontario municipal elections
Wellington County, Ontario